Ernest Barrie (born 1955) is a Scottish killer who is notable for having killed a man after having previously had his conviction for robbery quashed with help from the Rough Justice programme, which investigated supposed miscarriages of justice. Convicted of robbing a branch of the Clydesdale Bank in Blantyre in 1986, his conviction was quashed on appeal in 1989 after Rough Justice claimed that the robber caught on CCTV may not have been Barrie. Subsequently, in July 2007, he attacked and killed his 38-year-old neighbour Alan Hughes in his flat in Hutchesontown, Glasgow, inflicting 47 injuries upon him in a 15-minute long attack. He pleaded guilty to culpable homicide in 2009.

Biography
Barrie was convicted of robbing a branch of the Clydesdale Bank in Blantyre, Lanarkshire, of £40,000 in 1986 and sentenced to 18 years' imprisonment. He was freed on appeal after an investigation by Rough Justice which found that the robber caught on CCTV was not Barrie. The 1987 episode of Rough Justice which featured his case was titled "Evidence in Camera". 

In 1998 his son Ernest fell into the River Clyde 300 yards (274 metres) from the family home and died. The Rough Justice team sent him flowers and a card. 

In July 2007 Barrie beat his neighbour to death at his flat at 305 Caledonia Road, Gorbals, Glasgow, with his downstairs neighbour calling the police after hearing the violent attack take place over 15 minutes. When they arrived they found the man in a pool of blood and although he was then still alive he bled to death. Barrie had inflicted 47 separate injuries with a knife, a toilet cistern lid, a walking stick and a metal pole during the prolonged attack. Barrie pleaded guilty to culpable homicide (he had originally been charged with murder but pleaded guilty to the reduced charge) and psychiatrists agreed that he was suffering from a psychotic illness. Sentencing, the judge said: "This is a very serious crime and a lengthy custodial sentence is the only possible sentence. I also have to make sure the public is protected from you after you are released". He was sentenced to nine years' imprisonment and was also ordered to be supervised for three years after his release from prison.

References

Living people
1955 births
1986 crimes in the United Kingdom
1986 in Scotland
1987 in Scotland
1989 in Scotland
2007 in Scotland
2008 in Scotland
2009 in Scotland
Overturned convictions in Scotland
BBC television documentaries
British crime television series
Investigative journalism
Crime in Glasgow
Organised crime in Scotland
1998 in Scotland
Crime in Scotland
Overturned convictions in the United Kingdom
1980s in Glasgow
2000s in Glasgow
Criminals from Glasgow
People from Glasgow
British male criminals
Scottish criminal law
1989 in British law
2007 in British law
2008 in British law
2009 in British law
Trials in Scotland
Murder trials
1980s trials
2000s trials